The province of Badajoz is a province of western Spain located in the autonomous community of Extremadura. It was formed in 1833. It is bordered by the provinces of Cáceres in the north, Toledo, Ciudad Real in the east, Córdoba in the south-east, Seville, and Huelva in the south and Portugal in the west.

The other province of Extremadura, Cáceres, is the second largest with 19,868 km2 in area. The province has a relatively lower population density in comparison to other provinces in Spain.

, the province has a population of 669,943 inhabitants. Its capital is the city of Badajoz.

History  
The province enjoyed great prominence during the Roman empire when Mérida was made one of the capital cities. When the Visigoth period ended and the Moors had invaded Spain, the Ibn-al-Aftas dynasty established a great cultural and scientific centre in the province. Many of the explorers who set out to conquer the New World were from this province.

Geography

Topography
Although many districts have low ranges of hills, the surface is more often a desolate and monotonous plain, flat or slightly undulating. Its one large river is the Guadiana, which traverses the north of the province from east to west, fed by many tributaries; but it is only at certain seasons that the river-beds fill with any considerable volume of water, and the Guadiana may frequently be forded without difficulty. The climate is continental with great extremes of heat in summer and of cold in winter, when fierce north and north-west winds blow across the plains. Mountains, pastures and Mediterranean forests are important geographical features of this province.

Administrative divisions
The Province of Badajoz is divided into 165 municipalities. After Badajoz, the capital, the main towns in the province are Almendralejo, Azuaga, Don Benito, Olivenza, Jerez de los Caballeros, Mérida, Zafra, Montijo and Villanueva de la Serena. There are also traditional comarcas (shires, but with no administrative role) in the province, including La Siberia and Llanos de Olivenza. The capital city of Badajoz is the most important commercial center of the province. The Council of Badajoz has its seat in this city.

Demographics 
The province of Badajoz has 673,559 inhabitants (INE 2019), with a population density in 2018 of 31.07 inhabitants/km2, below the national average (91.13 inhabitants/km2).

It is the twenty-third most populated province in the country, just behind Toledo. It exceeds in almost 280 000 inhabitants to Cáceres (396 487), the other Extremaduran province.

22.26% of its inhabitants live in the city of Badajoz, which, with a population of 150702 (INE 2019), stands out as the most populated urban centre in the province. The next city by population is Mérida, which with 59335 inhabitants (INE 2019), is home to 8.81% of the province's total population.

Evolution of the population of the province of Badajoz since 1842 
The population in the province of Badajoz has been characterized by a constant growth until the 1960s, when a strong exodus towards more prosperous areas of the country began, mainly Catalonia and Madrid, reducing the population by almost 200 000 inhabitants in a matter of 20 years. Since the 1980s the population has stagnated below 700 000, with a slight growth until 2010, when the trend is again reversed and the province loses population again. If we observe the trend by municipalities, we can see how the municipalities located in the mountains to the east and south of the province are constantly losing population while those located near the population centres of Badajoz, Mérida, Don Benito or Almendralejo are growing.

The historical population is given in the following chart:

Economy 

The economic production differs according to the region and locality. Thus the big cities like Badajoz, Mérida, Don Benito, Almendralejo and others, offer and live from services and to a lesser extent from general industries of medium type. In the regions of Guadiana, Tierra de Mérida - Vegas Bajas, Vegas Altas and part of Tierra de Badajoz, and in Tierra de Barros besides the traditional source of agricultural wealth, there is a flourishing industry of agro-livestock transformation. In other regions more distant from urban centres and the main roads, such as Campiña Sur, La Serena and La Siberia, the main source is the primary sector, i.e. agriculture and perhaps even more livestock (sheep and pig).

The agricultural sector is dominated by irrigated areas in the Guadiana Valley (Badajoz, Montijo, Mérida, Don Benito-Villanueva), the predominant olive groves in Tierra de Barros, and the vineyards, extensive in Tierra de Barros and in Llerena (Campiña Sur).

The industrial sector, although less developed and very low in proportion to national activity, has a proportion of employed population similar to the agro-livestock sector: 12.13% (up to 26% if we include construction) compared to 14% (primary sector). The two main cities of the province stand out: Badajoz and Mérida, with their respective industrial parks; and the towns of Jerez de los Caballeros, Don Benito-Villanueva and Almendralejo.

The tertiary sector is the most predominant sector in the province (61.87% of the population employed), where the business (Almendralejo and Zafra), commercial (Badajoz) and tourism and administrative (Mérida) sectors stand out.

Tourist destinations 
The economy of the province is based on tourism and agriculture. Some of the popular tourist destinations of the province include Badajoz, Fregenal de la Sierra, Jerez de los Caballeros, Llerena, Mérida, Olivenza, Alange, Alburquerque and Almendralejo. The popular dishes include hare, partridge and various pork products. Cornalvo Nature Reserve, the ancient structure of Roman Theatre in Mérida, National Museum of Roman Art in Mérida, Alcazaba City Wall and Ibn Marwan Monument and Espantaperros Tower of Badajoz Fortress are popular tourist spots.

The National Museum of Roman Art was designed in 1980 by architect José Rafael Moneo Vallés and completed in 1985.  The architect designed the museum to have a Roman feel and look.  Romans used to control present-day Spain, also known as the Iberian Peninsula, in the years following their arrival around 295 BC.  Today, Mérida has the greatest number of noteworthy Roman buildings still surviving.  It is also famous on an archaeological basis.  The museum exhibits remnants of Roman infrastructure and dwellings, including those showing Christian influences like a basilica, and tombs.  Inspiration for the National Museum of Roman Art dates back to 1838, when the city located the museum in a church, Santa Clara.

See also 
 Extremadura

Notes and references

External links 

 Diputación de Badajoz

 
States and territories established in 1833